Listowel Airport  is located  northwest of Listowel, Ontario, Canada.

References

Registered aerodromes in Ontario